The Canadian Forces provost marshal  (CFPM) is an advisor to the chief of the defence staff on policing matters. He or she is an active member of the Canadian Association of Chiefs of Police. The CFPM also is the commander of the Canadian Forces Military Police.  The organization includes the Canadian Forces National Investigation Service, the investigation arm of the Canadian Forces Military Police, the Canadian Forces Service Prison and Detention Barracks, the Military Police Security Service and the Canadian Forces Military Police Academy.

The CFPM commands all military police directly involved in policing duties. In this capacity, he or she is responsible for investigations conducted by any unit or other element under his or her command; the establishment of and compliance with selection, training and professional standards for the military police, as well as investigations in respect of conduct that is inconsistent with the professional standards applicable to the military police or the Military Police Professional Code of Conduct.

The CFPM reports to the vice chief of the defence staff.

The current CFPM and commander of the Canadian Forces Military Police Group is Brigadier-General Simon Trudeau who assumed command on May 28, 2018.

Brigadier-General Simon Trudeau said, "On behalf of the women and men of the Canadian Forces Military Police Group, I thank Brigadier-General Delaney for his leadership these past five years. Under his watch we have transformed, expanded, and built on our proud history as a policing organization respected worldwide for its professionalism and integrity. I am looking forward to working with the dedicated and talented members of the MP Group to ensure that Canada's Military Police remains operationally oriented as we implement Canada's defence policy Strong, Secured, Engaged."

Brigadier-General Simon Trudeau enrolled in the Canadian Armed Forces in 1988 and commenced his military police career following graduation from the Royal Military College Saint-Jean in 1992. He has held numerous leadership positions across various functions with the military police, including operational deployments in Bosnia-Herzegovina in 1997 and Afghanistan in 2002. Prior to his appointment as CFPM, Brigadier-General Trudeau was Deputy Commander of the Canadian Forces Military Police Group.

References

Military provosts of Canada